Mimudea brevialis is a moth of the family Crambidae.

References

Moths of Asia
Moths described in 1859